Plasmodium lainsoni is a parasite of the genus Plasmodium.

Like all Plasmodium species P. lainsoni has both vertebrate and insect hosts. The vertebrate hosts for this parasite are reptiles.

Description 

The parasite was first described by Telford in 1978. It produces rounded schizonts containing 14 to 32 merozoites. Its gametocytes are typically round or oval.

Geographical occurrence 

This species is found in Venezuela, South America.

Clinical features and host pathology 

The only known host of this species is the lizard Phyllodactylus ventralis.

References 

lainsoni